Tommaso Costanzi (1700–1747) was an Italian gem engraver of the late-Baroque period. 

He was born to a family of gem-makers and artists in Naples. His father Giovanni and brother Carlo were also a gem engravers, while his other brother Placido became a painter. Tommaso later moved and worked the rest of his life in Rome. None of his works survive, but he was noted in documentation by Giovanni Pichler.

References

1700 births
1747 deaths
Artists from Naples
18th-century Italian artists
Engraved gem artists